Marko Tušek (born July 17, 1975) is a Slovenian former professional basketball player. He also represented the Slovenian national team in the international competitions.

External links

 Marko Tušek at acb.com
 Marko Tušek at draftexpress.com
 Marko Tušek at eurobasket.com
 Marko Tušek at euroleague.net
 Marko Tušek at legabasket.it

1975 births
Living people
Basket Rimini Crabs players
BC UNICS players
Baloncesto Málaga players
KK Olimpija players
Liga ACB players
Menorca Bàsquet players
Pallacanestro Virtus Roma players
Power forwards (basketball)
Slovenian men's basketball players
Victoria Libertas Pallacanestro players
People from Trbovlje
Vanoli Cremona players